The 1934 Liège–Bastogne–Liège was the 24th edition of the Liège–Bastogne–Liège cycle race and was held on 13 May 1934. The race started and finished in Liège. The race was won by Théo Herckenrath.

General classification

References

1934
1934 in Belgian sport